Tyagaraja Aradhana is an annual aradhana (a Sanskrit term meaning act of glorifying God or a person) of Telugu saint composer Tyagaraja. The music festival is observed in the states of Andhra Pradesh, Karnataka and Tamil Nadu, primarily in Tiruvaiyaru in Thanjavur district of Tamilnadu, the place where Tyagaraja attained Jeeva Samadhi.The aradhana is observed on Pushya Bahula Panchami day when the saint attained Jeeva samadhi, where the musicians render the saint's Pancharatna Kritis.

History
The aradhana (Ceremony of Adoration) is held every year on the anniversary of the demise of the saint. This is on Pushya Bahula Panchami day (the fifth day of the waning moon in the Hindu lunar month of Pushya). The Aradhana is conducted by the Sri Thyagabrahma Mahotsava Sabha and is held in the precincts of the samadhi (memorial) of the saint located at Thiruvaiyaru village, Thanjavur district, Tamil Nadu, India.

The Aradhana in its present format is not even a hundred years old. Tyagaraja died in 1847. A few days before his death, he had formally renounced everything and become a sanyasi. When he passed on, his mortal remains were buried on the banks of the river Kaveri and a small memorial was built at the site. His disciples returned to their respective villages and observed his death anniversary at their own homes. The memorial soon fell into neglect and had become quite dilapidated by 1903, when two of the last surviving students to have been taught by Tyagaraja happened to make a nostalgic visit to the site. These were the elderly and eminent musicians Umayalpuram Krishna Bhagavatar and Sundara Bhagavatar. They were dismayed by the neglect and dilapidation; indeed, they had to search for the memorial in the wild foliage of the riverbank. They arranged for the renovation of the samadhi and decided to commemorate the tithi or death anniversary of their guru every year at the Samadhi itself.

From the following year, efforts were made by musical stalwarts to observe the death anniversary regularly at Tiruvayyaru, and to use the occasion as an opportunity for his followers to converge and interact with each other. In 1905, a lavish ceremony, complete with feeding of the poor and worship at the memorial as per Vedic tenets, was celebrated. While  Umayalpuram Krishna Bhagavatar and Sundara Bhagavatar were the moving force behind the renovations and celebrations, the brothers Tillaisthanam Narasimha Bhagavatar and Tillaisthanam Panju Bhagavatar were the main financiers and organizers. By the following year, the brothers had fallen out with each other. From 1906 onwards, each began conducting a parallel Aradhana. Various musicians also began aligned themselves with one or the other brother and two rival factions came into being. The group (and the aradhana celebration) conducted by Narasimha Bhagavatar came to be called the Periya Katchi ("senior party," since he was the elder) and that of Panju Bhat became known as the Chinna Katchi. With the passing of the Tillaisthanam brothers, the Periya Katchi came under the control of the ace violinist Malaikottai Govindasami Pillai, and the Chinna Katchi under that of Soolamangalam Vaidyanatha Bhagavatar, the noted Harikatha exponent. Gradually, a convention emerged whereby the Chinna Katchi's celebrations began five days before the Aradhana and concluded on the Aradhana day, while the Periya Katchi's celebration began on Aradhana day and continued for four days after that. Both groups organised music performances and feeding of the poor and so the public was the real beneficiary during the nine days. On one point, both groups were united. They did not allow women to perform during the Aradhana. In those days, the only women who sang or danced in public were the devadasi or temple performers. Another point in common between the two groups was that they did not permit nadaswaram performances.

Bangalore Nagarathnamma was precisely such a temple performer, and one of the most famous professional concert artistes of her era. Nagarathnamma, who was then residing in Madras, was an ardent devotee of Tyagaraja and an aficionado of his music. Indeed, the soulful rendition of his kritis had been the mainstay of her career throughout her life, and she considered that she owed her considerable wealth to his grace. In 1921, the aged and childless lady decided to dedicate her life's earnings to preserving Tyagaraja's legacy and perpetuating his memory. In 1925, she began the construction of a temple enclosing the memorial. According to some sources, she purchased the land on which the grave stood, whereas according to other sources, that land was panchayat riverside land (village common land), and her construction was illegal, but tolerated by local residents due to its pious intentions. Nagarathnamma also had an idol of Tyagaraja sculpted and installed in front of the memorial. The consecration of the temple took place in early 1926. The two rival groups, while not interfering with all this, refused to let Nagarathnamma perform her music, or even Harikatha, within the temple which she herself had had constructed. They cited several instances from Tyagaraja's songs where he had complained about women in general.

Undeterred, Nagarathnammal began a third front which conducted its own music programs at the rear of the shrine. This third event featured many women artistes, and perhaps for that very reason, it began eating into the public popularity of the events hosted by the two Katchis. The doughty lady also filed suits in the local courts demanding the prevention of the Katchis from entering the temple, claiming that it belonged to her by right. She lost the case, but the hours of worship were laid down by the courts, dividing the Aradhana day equally between the two Katchis and her own group.

Matters continued this way till 1940, when SY Krishnaswami, ICS, convinced the groups to unite and it was in 1941 that the Aradhana as we know it was first conducted. Harikesanallur Muthiah Bhagavatar selected the five pancharatnas as being best suited for group rendering, so that a common homage by all musicians became possible. This idea was adopted and the choral rendition of the five songs was made an integral feature of the Aradhana. Before 1941, the three separate events had all been in the nature of music festivals, with no restriction regarding which of Thyagaraja's songs could be performed. It was only in 1941, when the three events were merged into one, that the convention of group singing of the five pancharatna kritis was decided upon.

Bangalore Nagarathnammal spent the rest of her days in Tiruvayyaru and bequeathed all her wealth to the Tyagaraja memorial, with the stipulation that women be allowed to pay their homage without any hindrance. When she died in 1952, she was buried close to Tyagaraja's memorial and a statue was erected on the spot. The statue directly gazes on Tyagaraja's memorial.

A huge complex is now under construction at Thiruvaiyaru at this site to accommodate the large audience that come to the concert in ever-increasing numbers every year.

Annual aradhana festival at Thiruvaiyaru
2023 - 176th aradhana festival - 06 to 11 January 2023. Annual aradhana festival organised by Sri Thyagabrahma Mahotsava Sabha commenced at Thiruvaiyaru on Sunday 6 January 2023. Telangana Governor and Puducherry Lt Governor Tamilisai Soundarajan Inaugurated the festival. President of the Sabha, G.K. Vasan, deliverd the inaugural speach. Ranjani Gayatri, S. Sowmya, A. Kanyakumari, Embar S Kannan, Sikkil Gurucharan, Srimushnam V Raja Rao, U Rajesh, Pantula Rama, Jayanthi Kumaresh, Priyadarshini, Binni Krishnakumar, Sudha Raghunathan and others performed solo concert. New Carnatic kriti 'Sri Ramachandram Bhajami' sung by Priyadarshini in new raga 'Sri Tyagaraja'  created and music composed by Mahesh Mahadev named after Saint Sri Thyagaraja was released on 10 January 2023 at Tyagaraja Samadi. Tamil Nadu Governor R N Ravi was present in the major event of the festival of rendering Pancharathna Kritis by musicians which was conducted on January 11January 2023 

2022 - 175th aradhana festival

2021 - 174th aradhana festival

2020 - 173rd aradhana festival

2019 - 172nd aradhana festival

2018 - 171st aradhana festival

2017 - 170th aradhana festival

2016 – 169th aradhana festival – 24 to 28 January 2016. This year annual aradhana festival organised by Sri Thyagabrahma Mahotsava Sabha commenced at Thiruvaiyaru on Sunday 24 January 2016.
Inaugurating the festival, ‘Nalli’ Kuppuswami Chetti, president of Sri Krishna Gana Sabha, paid rich tributes to Bangalore Nagarathnamma Ammal who was instrumental in setting up the ‘adhishtanam’ for Sadguru Tyagabrahmmam.
Collector N. Subbaiyan said music played a crucial role in promoting universal peace and harmony. G. Rangasamy Moopanar, president of the Sabha, and G.K. Vasan, chairman of the trust, spoke.

2015 – 168th aradhana festival – 6 to 10 January 2015. The inauguration of the festival at Thiruvaiyaru was inaugurated on 6 January 2015 by Justice V. Ramasubramanian, Madras High Court judge, by lighting lamp. Sri Thyagabrahma Mahotsava Sabha chairman G.K. Vasan and sabha president G. Rangasamy Moopanar accompanied him

2014 – 167th aradhana festival 

2013 – 166th aradhana festival – 27 to 31 January 2013.

2012 – 165th aradhana festival.

2011 – 164th aradhana festival.

Festivals celebrated globally

United States
In the United States, the Cleveland Thyagaraja Festival is held in Cleveland, Ohio every year around Easter. Hundreds of Carnatic musicians preside over, and perform in the festival.

Mauritius

In the small pearl of the Indian Ocean, Mauritius Island, Tyagaraja Aradhana is celebrated with great devotion by the Vyasha Dhalia Ashram. Abhishekam is done for Shri Rama in the morning and followed by the Kritis of Tyagaraja Swami accompanied by instruments such as mridangam, morsing, ghatam, khanjira, veena, violin and the flute.

Nigeria

In Lagos, Nigeria, from the year 2007 every February, Tyagaraja Aradhana is being celebrated devotionally by Chinmaya Mission.  Children trained by experienced Gurus along with music instruments rendering sampradaya kirthanas of the compositions of Saint Tyagaraja in this function.

United Kingdom
In the United Kingdom there are various aradhanes. Tyagaraja Aradhana Festival UK - Londonil Thiruvaiyaru is organised and run by
committee in conjunction with Sri Duraiswamy music school run by Sri.Durai Balasubramanian, who was a former lecturer at Tamil Nadu Government music college. Many students from all over London perform Tygaraja krithis. The 8th aradhane took place on the 23.2.20. Artists Sriram Ganghadharan, Sri.R. Suryaprakash and Sri Rithvik Raja accompanied many senior artists of the UK.

See also
List of Indian classical music festivals

References

Music festivals in India
Carnatic classical music festivals
Concerts
Music festivals established in 1846
Hindu music festivals